Pelargoderus arouensis is a species of beetle in the family Cerambycidae. It was described by James Thomson in 1857, originally under the genus Rhamses. It is known from Papua New Guinea and Moluccas.

References

arouensis